The Royal Society for the Protection of Birds (RSPB) is Europe's largest wildlife conservation charity. 

This is a list of RSPB reserves.

England

A
Adur Estuary, Shoreham-by-Sea, West Sussex
Amberley Wild Brooks, West Sussex
Arne, Dorset
Aylesbeare Common, Devon

B
 Beckingham Marshes, Nottinghamshire
 Bempton Cliffs, Yorkshire
 Berney Marshes, Norfolk
 Blacktoft Sands, Yorkshire
  Blean Woods, Kent
 Bowling Green Marsh, Devon
 Brading Marshes, Isle of Wight
 Breydon Water, Norfolk
 Broadwater Warren, Kent
 Buckenham Marshes, Norfolk
 Burton Mere Wetlands, Cheshire

C
Campfield Marsh, Cumbria
Chapel Wood, Devon
Church Wood, Buckinghamshire
Cliffe Pools, Kent
Coombes Valley, Staffordshire
Coquet Island, off Amble, Northumberland

D
Dingle Marshes, Suffolk
Dungeness, Kent

E
Elmley Marshes, Kent
Exminster Marshes, Devon

F
Fairburn Ings, West Yorkshire
Farnham Heath, Surrey
Fen Drayton Lakes, Cambridgeshire
Fore Wood, East Sussex
Fowlmere, Cambridgeshire
Frampton Marsh, Lincolnshire
Freiston Shore, Lincolnshire

G
Garston Wood, Dorset
Gayton Sands, Cheshire
Geltsdale RSPB reserve, Cumbria
Greylake, part of the Greylake SSSI Somerset

H
Ham Wall, Somerset
Havergate Island, Suffolk
Haweswater, Cumbria
Hayle Estuary, Cornwall
Highnam Woods, Gloucestershire
Hodbarrow RSPB reserve, Cumbria

L
Labrador Bay, Devon
Lakenheath Fen, Suffolk
 Langford Lowfields, Nottinghamshire
Langstone Harbour, Hampshire
Leighton Moss, Silverdale, Lancashire
The Lodge, Bedfordshire
Lodmoor, Dorset

M
Marazion Marsh, Cornwall
Marshside, Merseyside
Middleton Lakes, Warwickshire/Staffordshire
Minsmere, Suffolk
Morecambe Bay, Lancashire

N
Nagshead, Parkend, Gloucestershire
Nene Washes, Cambridgeshire
Nor Marsh and Motney Hill, Kent
Northward Hill, Kent
North Warren, Suffolk

O
Dearne Valley Old Moor, Yorkshire
Otmoor, Oxfordshire
Ouse Washes, Cambridgeshire

P
Pulborough Brooks, West Sussex

R
Radipole Lake, Dorset
Rainham Marshes, Essex, London
Rye Meads, Hertfordshire

S
Saltholme, Teesside
Sandwell Valley, Birmingham
Sherwood Forest, Nottinghamshire
Snettisham, Norfolk
South Essex Marshes, Essex
St Bees Head, Cumbria
Stour Estuary, Essex
Strumpshaw Fen, Norfolk
Surlingham Church Marsh, Surlingham, Norfolk
Swell Wood, part of the Fivehead Woods and Meadow SSSI, Somerset

T
Titchwell Marsh, Hunstanton, Norfolk
Tudeley Woods, Kent

W
West Sedgemoor, Somerset
Wolves Wood, Suffolk

Northern Ireland

B
Belfast Lough, Belfast

L
Lough Foyle, County Londonderry
Lower Lough Erne Islands, County Fermanagh

P
Portmore Lough, County Antrim

R
Rathlin Island Cliffs, County Antrim

Scotland

A
Ailsa Craig, South Ayrshire

B
Balranald, North Uist
Baron's Haugh, North Lanarkshire
Birsay Moors, Orkney
Brodgar, Orkney

C
Coll, Argyll and Bute
Copinsay, Orkney
Corrimony, Highland
Cottascarth and Rendall Moss, Orkney
Culbin Sands, Highland

D
Dunnet Head, Caithness

F
Fairy Glen, Highland
Fetlar, Shetland
Forsinard, Sutherland, Highland
Fowlsheugh, Aberdeenshire

G
Glenborrodale, Highland

H
Hobbister, Orkney
Hoy, Orkney

I
Insh Marshes, Badenoch and Strathspey, Highland
Inversnaid

K
Ken-Dee Marshes, Dumfries and Galloway

L
Loch Garten Osprey Centre, Badenoch and Strathspey, Highland
Loch Gruinart, Argyll and Bute
Loch of Kinnordy, Angus
Loch Ruthven, Highland
Loch of Spiggie, Shetland
Loch Strathbeg, Aberdeenshire
Lochwinnoch, Renfrewshire
The Loons and Loch of Banks, Orkney

M
Marwick Head, Orkney
Mersehead, Dumfries and Galloway
Mill Dam, Orkney
Mousa, Shetland
Mull of Galloway, Dumfries and Galloway

N
Nigg Bay, Highland
North Hill, Orkney
Noup Cliffs, Orkney

O
The Oa, Argyll and Bute
Onziebust, Orkney

S
Sumburgh Head, Shetland

T
Trumland, Orkney

U
Udale Bay, Highland

V
Vane Farm, Perth and Kinross

W
Wood of Cree, Dumfries and Galloway

Wales

C
Carngafallt
Conwy
Cwm Clydach

G
Grassholm
Gwenffrwd & Dinas, Carmarthenshire

M
Malltraeth
Mawddach Valley

N
Newport Wetlands Reserve

P
Point of Ayr, Flintshire

R
Ramsey Island

S
South Stack, Anglesey

V
Valley Wetlands, Anglesey
Lake Vyrnwy, Powys

Y
Ynys-hir

References

External links
 RSPB reserves

 
Nature reserves in the United Kingdom
RSPB